Libythea is a widespread genus of nymphalid butterflies commonly called beaks or snouts. They are strong fliers and may even be migratory.

Classification 

 Source:  The higher classification of Nymphalidae, at Nymphalidae.net
 Note: Names preceded by an equal sign (=) are synonyms, homonyms, rejected names or invalid names.

Subfamily Libytheinae Boisduval, 1833
 Libythea Fabricius, 1807 (= Hecaerge Ochsenheimer, 1816; = Chilea Billberg, 1820; = Hypatus Hübner, 1822; = Libythaeus Boitard, 1828; = Dichora Scudder, 1889)
 Libythea geoffroy Godart, 1824
 Libythea geoffroy geoffroy Godart, 1824
 Libythea geoffroy alompra Moore, 1901 (= Libythea hauxwelli Moore, 1901)
 Libythea geoffroy antipoda Boisduval, 1859 (= Libythea quadrinotata Butler, 1877)
 Libythea geoffroy bardas Fruhstorfer, 1914
 Libythea geoffroy batchiana Wallace, 1869
 Libythea geoffroy celebensis Staudinger, 1859
 Libythea geoffroy ceramensis Wallace, 1869
 Libythea geoffroy deminuta Fruhstorfer, 1910
 Libythea geoffroy genia Waterhouse, 1938
 Libythea geoffroy howarthi Peterson, 1968
 Libythea geoffroy maenia Fruhstorfer, 1902 (= Libythea geoffroy eugenia Fruhstorfer, 1910)
 Libythea geoffroy nicevillei Olliff, 1891
 Libythea geoffroy orientalis Godman & Salvin, 1888
 Libythea geoffroy philippina Staudinger, 1889
 Libythea geoffroy pulchra Butler, 1882 (= Libythea neopommerana Pagenstecher, 1896)  
 Libythea geoffroy sumbensis Pagenstecher, 1896
 Libythea collenettei Poulton & Riley, 1928
 Libythea narina Godart, 1819
 Libythea narina narina Godart, 1819 (= Libythea hatami Kenrick, 1911)
 Libythea narina canuleia Fruhstorfer, 1910
 Libythea narina luzonica Semper, 1889
 Libythea narina nahathaka Fruhstorfer, 1914
 Libythea narina neratia Felder, 1864
 Libythea narina rohini Marshall, 1880 (= Libythea libera de Niceville, 1890; = Libythea hybrida Martin, 1896; = Libythea tibera Pagenstecher, 1902)
 Libythea narina sangha Fruhstorfer, 1914
 Libythea narina sumbawana Fruhstorfer, 1914
 Libythea labdaca Westwood & Hewitson, 1851
 Libythea labdaca labdaca Westwood & Hewitson, 1851 (= Libythea labdaca werneri Fruhstrofer, 1903)
 Libythea labdaca laius Trimen, 1879 (= Libythea labdaca cinyras Trimen, 1866; = Libythea labdaca lepitoides Moore, 1901)
 Libythea ancoata Grose-Smith, 1891
 Libythea tsiandava Grose-Smith, 1891
 Libythea myrrha Godart, 1819
 Libythea myrrha myrrha Godart, 1819
 Libythea myrrha borneensis Fruhstorfer, 1914
 Libythea myrrha carma Fruhstorfer, 1914
 Libythea myrrha hecura Fruhstorfer, 1914
 Libythea myrrha myrrhina Fruhstorfer, 1910
 Libythea myrrha rama Moore, 1872
 Libythea myrrha sanguinalis Fruhstorfer, 1898
 Libythea myrrha thira Fruhstorfer, 1914
 Libythea myrrha yawa Fruhstorfer, 1914
 Libythea celtis (Fuessly, 1782) (original name = Papilio celtis Fuessly, 1782)
 Libythea celtis celtis (Fuessly, 1782)
 Libythea celtis amamiana Shirozu, 1956
 Libythea celtis celtoides Fruhstorfer, 1909
 Libythea celtis chinensis Fruhstorfer, 1909
 Libythea celtis formosana Fruhstorfer, 1909
 Libythea celtis lepita Moore, 1857
 Libythea celtis sophene Fruhstorfer, 1914
 Libythea cinyras Trimen, 1866
 Libythea laius Trimen, 1879
 Libythea laius laius Trimen, 1879
 Libythea laius lepitoides Moore, 1903
 Libythea laius tsiandava Grose-Smith 1891

References

 
Libytheinae
Nymphalidae genera
Taxa named by Johan Christian Fabricius